Eddings is a surname. Notable people with the surname include:

David Eddings (1931–2009), American fantasy writer
Doug Eddings (born 1968), American baseball umpire
Floyd Eddings (born 1958), American football player
John McNeil Eddings (1830-1896), Canadian military storekeeper and civic leader
Leigh Eddings (1937–2007), American fantasy writer